Halldór Halldórsson may refer to:

 Halldór Halldórsson (footballer, born 1931), Icelandic footballer
 Halldór Halldórsson (footballer, born 1961), Icelandic footballer